Petrophila fulicalis is a moth in the family Crambidae. It was described by James Brackenridge Clemens in 1860. It is found in North America, where it has been recorded from Alabama, Florida, Indiana, Maine, Maryland, Michigan, New York, North Carolina, Ohio, Oklahoma, Ontario, Pennsylvania, Tennessee and West Virginia.

References

Petrophila
Moths described in 1860